Igor Nóbrega de Lima (born 28 March 1980), known simply as Igor de Lima, is a Brazilian former footballer who played as a midfielder.

Honours
Sheriff Tiraspol
Moldovan National Division: 2003–04, 2004–05
Moldovan Super Cup: 2004, 2005

References

1980 births
Living people
Brazilian footballers
Association football midfielders
Moldovan Super Liga players
Liga I players
Treze Futebol Clube players
ABC Futebol Clube players
Esporte Clube XV de Novembro (Piracicaba) players
FC Sheriff Tiraspol players
FC Vaslui players
Centro Sportivo Paraibano players
Grêmio Recreativo Serrano players
Brazilian expatriate footballers
Expatriate footballers in Moldova
Brazilian expatriate sportspeople in Moldova
Expatriate footballers in Romania
Brazilian expatriate sportspeople in Romania